, or King Koopa, is a fictional character, the main antagonist in Nintendo's Mario franchise. Depicted as the arch-nemesis of the portly plumber Mario, Bowser is the leader of the turtle-like Koopa race. His ultimate goals are to kidnap Princess Peach and conquer the Mushroom Kingdom. Bowser's defining traits are his monstrous appearance with dragon-like elements, full-throated roar, fire-breathing abilities and tyrannical personality. 

Bowser initially appears as Mario's opponent in the 1985 video game Super Mario Bros. He was originally envisioned as an ox based on the Ox-King from the Toei Animation film Alakazam the Great, but Nintendo Designer Takashi Tezuka remarked that the character looked a lot more like a turtle than an ox, and the two collaborated to define Bowser's appearance, leading to the character becoming the leader of the turtle-like Koopas.

Bowser’s current voice actor is Kenneth W. James. His previous voice actors include Scott Burns, who gave Bowser his first spoken dialogue in a video game; Eric Newsome, who voiced him in Super Paper Mario; and Charles Martinet, who provided vocal effects for Bowser in Super Mario 64 and the Nintendo DS remake of the game.

After Super Mario Bros., Bowser also began to branch off to different genres. These include role-playing games such as Paper Mario and Mario & Luigi, and sports games such as Mario Kart and Mario Tennis. He has appeared in other Nintendo properties, such as in the Super Smash Bros. series of crossover fighting games. Bowser has also appeared in various animations, including three series produced by DIC Entertainment (all voiced by Harvey Atkin), and was portrayed by Dennis Hopper in the 1993 Super Mario Bros. film. He will be voiced by Jack Black in the upcoming 2023 film adaptation.

Bowser has received a mostly positive reception, with several critics noting that he is one of the most iconic and most recognizable video game villains ever.

Concept and creation

Bowser was created by Nintendo designer and producer Shigeru Miyamoto. Miyamoto had first envisioned Bowser as an ox, basing him on the Ox-King from the Toei Animation film Alakazam the Great. However, Nintendo designer Takashi Tezuka pointed out that the character looked a lot more like a turtle than an ox. Miyamoto and Tezuka then began to work together to define Bowser's appearance. Since the character was the leader of the turtle-like Koopa Troopas the two began to base his new appearance on them, creating a new illustration. In his final design, Miyamoto commented that he could make Bowser "look cool now".

Miyamoto named him  Daimaō Kuppa. Miyamoto had also considered the names  Yukke and  Bibinba, also Japanese names of Korean dishes ( yukhoe and  bibimbap respectively). For the later North American release of the game, which also introduced the anglicized spelling Koopa, the character was named "Bowser". The Korean name for the character Bowser/Kuppa is not Gukbap, but  Kupa, which is essentially a phonetic round-trip translation. The name was anglicized to Kuppa rather than Koopa in the Japanese versions up until the release of Super Mario World.

Bowser was once imagined as an upright Koopa Troopa with spines on his back and fangs, according to the oldest known design. During the development of Super Mario Bros., Miyamoto contemplated commissioning the game's art to a manga artist or illustrator. However, due to a lack of time, he created the game's original box art himself. Bowser is depicted in this artwork in a way that differs from later renditions, with the most noticeable differences being his gray-blue complexion and lack of horns. Miyamoto received inspiration for the character's appearance from an anime film version of the Chinese novel Journey to the West, which was renamed Alakazam the Great during the film's Ameri period. Yōichi Kotabe based Bowser's final design on the Chinese softshell turtle, which he recognized to be a highly aggressive kind of turtle, reflecting Bowser's short temper.

Characteristics
Bowser is portrayed as the "King of the Koopas", anthropomorphic turtles that inhabit the world of the Mushroom Kingdom. Bowser differs greatly from the rest of the Koopa clan, which consists mainly of bipedal tortoises. He is characterized by a large, spiked turtle shell, horns, a draconic muzzle with fangs, taloned fingers, three clawed toes on each foot, red eyes and a shock of red hair. He is physically endowed with immense strength, is nearly indestructible, can breathe fire, and can jump very high for his large size. He is accomplished in black magic, thanks to which, depending on the game, he can teleport himself, summon objects, fly, generate a huge amount of electricity, use telekinesis, or metamorphose.

Bowser's physical size tends to vary from game to game. In most games, he towers over the majority of characters, but there are exceptions. In Super Mario RPG, he stands only slightly taller than Mario. He is shown changing his size at will or through others' sorcery in games including Yoshi's Island, Super Mario Galaxy and Super Mario Galaxy 2.

Bowser aspires to take over the Mushroom Kingdom and merge it with his own realm. He is infatuated with Princess Peach, and routinely kidnaps her as part of his plans for domination. Sometimes, he kidnaps Peach simply to lure Mario into a trap, but occasionally he hopes to marry her, such as in Super Mario Odyssey. The character's role in the franchise varies. He is typically the main antagonist in the main series, but in the RPG series, he sometimes works with the heroes to defeat a greater evil. The RPGs also portray Bowser in a more humorous light as a blustering, buffoonish bully with a hidden softer side. He also cares for his minions.

Bowser has a son, Bowser Jr., who helps his father kidnap Princess Peach. Bowser Jr.'s mother is unknown, as Bowser isn't yet officially confirmed as having a previous marriage. Originally in Super Mario Bros. 3, Bowser was stated to be the father of the Koopalings with subsequent official sources adding that he was their biological father, but since their return in New Super Mario Bros. Wii they have been referred to as Bowser's minions. In a 2012 interview, Shigeru Miyamoto stated, "Our current story is that the seven Koopalings are not Bowser's children. Bowser's only child is Bowser Jr., and we do not know who the mother is."

Appearances

Bowser makes his debut appearance in the video game Super Mario Bros.. He then appeared through all Super Mario games (with the exception of games such as Super Mario Land), as well as the Paper Mario series, the Yoshi series and the Mario & Luigi series.

Other Mario games
Bowser has appeared in nearly all of the Mario spin-off games, including in Mario Kart series, and every Mario Party game to date. Bowser has made appearances in multiple Mario sports games, such as Mario Tennis, Mario Golf, Super Mario Strikers, and Mario & Sonic at the Olympic Games.
 
He appeared in Mario's Time Machine, Hotel Mario, and Mario Pinball Land. Bowser also appears as a playable character in the game Itadaki Street DS. Bowser is also a Dark attribute character who appears as the main opponent in Puzzle & Dragons: Super Mario Bros. Edition.
 
Bowser also appears in Super Mario RPG: Legend of the Seven Stars. In Mario + Rabbids Kingdom Battle, Bowser makes a cameo. He also reappears in the sequel Mario + Rabbids Sparks of Hope.

In other media

Outside of Super Mario series, Bowser has appeared as a playable character in every installment of the Super Smash Bros. series since 2001's Super Smash Bros. Melee. Bowser can be found in Tetris Attack, a game inspired by the Japanese Panel de Pon. All of the original cast members are replaced, with the exception of Mr. Time, with characters from the Mario and Yoshi series, with Bowser taking on the role of Corderia as the game's final boss. Under the name Hammer Slam Bowser, Bowser debuts as a playable character in Skylanders: SuperChargers. He appears alongside Donkey Kong and comes with a Skylanders: Skylanders unique figurine. Bowser also appears as a playable character in Dr. Mario World under the name Dr. Bowser.
 
The late Dennis Hopper portrayed King Koopa in the 1993 live-action film Super Mario Bros. In the film, Koopa is the usurper ruler of Dinohattan, a city in a parallel universe in which humans evolved directly from dinosaurs. He abducts Princess Daisy but is eventually defeated by Mario and Luigi. This incarnation is almost entirely human in appearance, with blonde hair he gels in a crown-like shape, and he frequently wears a black business suit and necktie. However, after brief exposure to his own evolution-reversing technology by the Mario Bros., he starts occasionally possessing some reptilian traits. The climax of the film sees Koopa devolve into an enormous green Tyrannosaurus rex to battle the Mario Bros., who further devolve him into primordial ooze.

Bowser is one of the gaming villains attending a "Bad-Anon" support group in the 2012 animated film Wreck-It Ralph. The writers had early on envisioned the Bad-anon meeting with Bowser as a major character within the scene; according to film director Rich Moore, Nintendo was very positive towards this use, stating in Moore's own words, "If there is a group that is dedicated to helping the bad guy characters in video games then Bowser must be in that group!"

Bowser will be voiced by Jack Black in the upcoming 2023 film adaptation.

He appeared in Nintendo gamebooks. Bowser appears as the primary antagonist in Nintendo Power's comic series Super Mario Adventures. Bowser reappears in the Mario comics of Valiant Comics' Nintendo Comics System as the principal antagonist of the Mushroom Kingdom.

Reception and legacy
Due largely to the success of the Mario franchise, Bowser has become one of the most iconic and easily recognizable video game antagonists of all time. He frequently appears in lists for greatest video game antagonists. IGN placed him at #2 out of 100, and GamePro placed him at #9 out of 47. GameSpot listed him at #9 in their "Top 10 Video Game Villains" article, stating "Of all the villains to make an appearance on this list, Bowser... has got to be the most interesting," later adding "While some people say Bowser's life may have gotten into a rut, the man has simply refined his game down to an everyday thing. He's focused, he's dedicated, and worst of all, he's patient." Bowser ranked in the first slot on GameDailys top 10 Nintendo characters that deserve their own games list, explaining if Yoshi and Wario get their own games, Bowser should too due to his being one of gaming's most nefarious villains. In GameDailys top 10 Smash Bros. characters list, he ranked sixth. GameDaily also included him in their most persistent video game villains list. However, Bowser has been also rated as the 4th-biggest douchebag in gaming history by ScrewAttack, who said that he wants to "take Mario down". IGN editor Craig Harris described Bowser as being a household name. In 2011, Empire ranked him as the 23rd-greatest video game character while Guinness World Records Gamer's Edition 2013 featured Bowser first in their list of top 50 Villains. IGN named Bowser as one of the "oldest villains in gaming history, not to mention one of the most iconic."

Bowser's role in Super Mario Galaxy has been met with significant praise. Eurogamer editor Margaret Robertson commented that after years of being a "comedy villain", Galaxy put him back at his "scaly, scabrous best". PALGN editor Chris Sell called him the best boss in Mario Galaxy, stating that it wasn't just because of the battles with him being "superb, screen filling affairs", but also because he is "back to being mean again". Nintendo World Report editor Aaron Kaluszka commented that battling Bowser has never been "this intense and engaging". IGN editor Cam Shea praised his physical appearance in Super Mario Galaxy, describing him as "imposing and weighty". Another IGN editor, Matt Casamassina, praised the visual quality of the characters, citing Bowser in particular and mentioning how his "funky red fur waggles in the wind". Game Positive editor Travis Simmons concurred, commenting that his hair "gives him a touch of personality".

Bowser's role in Mario & Luigi: Bowser's Inside Story has also been met with highly positive reception. He has frequently been referenced as the main character of the game due to his prominence in it. Eurogamer editor Christian Donlan commented that it felt good to play as Bowser, and that "After years of picking a path carefully around threats, jumping out of harm's way, and tackling challengers mostly from above, it's a pleasure to put those cares aside and relish a few hours of spiky, tortoise-shelled power." Destructoid editor Jim Sterling described Bowser's gameplay as "brilliant comic relief". He also described the dialogue of the game as being "laugh out loud funny", specifically praising Bowser's ego. RPGamer editor Michael Cunningham praised the game for Bowser "stealing the show", but also decried it for not having quite enough of him. Nintendo World Report editor Pedro Hernandez commented that the plot and humour of the game make iconic characters "more enduring, including Bowser".
NGamer magazine editor Matthew Castle commented that all Mario role-playing games make good use of Bowser, but that this is the first game where Bowser takes the center stage. Game Style editor Drew Middlemas commented that Bowser stole the show, being portrayed as a "creature of pure, blustering ego who reminds us of why he's one of gaming's greatest baddies." N-Europe editor called him the "real star" of the game, calling him a "fantastic character" with "so much more to give than what we've seen from him so far, even in the other Mario RPGs". He added that his "foul mood and lack of intelligence" as well as his interactions with other characters are well written. Kombo editor commented that he became a more sympathetic character as the game progresses, adding that his "massive ego pushes him towards heroism". Wired editor Chris Kohler called Bowser awesome, adding that his segments are funnier than Mario and Luigi's. Giant Bomb editor Brad Shoemaker states that Bowser steals the show, commenting that playing as him gives players an inside glimpse of his ego and megalomania. IGN editor Craig Harris described Bowser as the only "core Nintendo character over the past couple decades" to not have a starring role in a video game, and this game acts as his "big break". 1UP.com editor Jeremy Parish stated that Bowser makes the game, describing him as more interesting than Bowser's Inside Story predecessor's partners, the baby forms of Mario and Luigi. GamePro editor Alicia Ashby called Bowser one of the most "lovable characters in the Nintendo universe", and praising Bowser's Inside Story for giving him "much deserved time in the spotlight". GameSpy editor Phil Theobald called him the breakout star of the game, stating that "the gruff, quick-to-anger pro/antagonist is a treat to watch as he continuously becomes infuriated with the incompetence of his minions." GamesRadar editor Henry Gilbert stated that he is "home to the most drastic change to the formula" in this game, stating that while he is still a "humorously incapable villain", the game allows players to switch between Bowser and the Mario Bros. at their discretion."

Fans wondered for years about what Mario said after he defeated Bowser, threw him, and shouted in the final battle of Super Mario 64 until Charles Martinet, Mario's voice actor, took to Twitter in April 2019 to assert Mario was saying "so long, King-a Bowser!". However, from July 2020, a fan restoration has made Mario seem much more like he is saying "Gay Bowser". In the Japanese version, as well as the Super Mario 3D All-Stars port, Mario instead says "buh-bye!", which Nintendo later confirmed in a tweet.

A Bowser standalone prop with a penis for usage in Bowser movies was created by 3D modeller "AkkoArcade". After a copyright claim was made by a party claiming to represent Nintendo of America, Patreon fully removed it.

In 2018, a short comic entitled "The Super Crown's some spicy new Mario lore" on DeviantArt and Twitter transforms Bowser into a monstrously sinister female resembling Peach, which fans named Bowsette. The character subsequently went viral, with Ars Technica writing that Bowsette's popularity was partly due to her contrast with Princess Peach and Bowser. Apart from Mario Day, "Bowser Day 2021" became a Twitter craze as fans commemorated the renowned Nintendo's iconic villain. When the alligator snapping turtle of the Amur River was discovered, it bore a resemblance to Bowser, making it become somewhat of an internet sensation.

References

Sources

External links
 
 Bowser at Giant Bomb
 Bowser on Play Nintendo

Fantasy film characters
Villains in animated television series
Animal characters in video games
Anthropomorphic video game characters
Dictator characters in video games
Dragon characters in video games
Fictional criminals in video games
Fictional commanders
Fictional kidnappers
Fictional monsters
Fictional turtles
King characters in video games
Male characters in video games
Male film villains
Male video game villains
Mario (franchise) characters
Mario (franchise) enemies
Super Smash Bros. fighters
Nintendo antagonists
Video game bosses
Video game characters introduced in 1985
Video game characters with fire or heat abilities
Video game characters with superhuman strength